The 1990 Women's European Cricket Cup was an international cricket tournament held in England from 18 to 22 July 1990. It was the second edition of the Women's European Championship, and all matches at the tournament held One Day International (ODI) status.

Four teams participated, with the hosts, England, joined by the three other European members of the International Women's Cricket Council (IWCC) – Denmark, Ireland, and the Netherlands. A round-robin format was used, with the top teams proceeding to the final. England was undefeated in the round-robin stage and beat Ireland by 65 runs in the final, winning the championship for a second consecutive time.
 England's Wendy Watson led the tournament in runs for a second year running, while Ireland's Susan Bray was the leading wicket-taker. The tournament was hosted by East Midlands Women's Cricket Association, a member of England's Women's Cricket Association, and matches were played at venues in three English counties (Leicestershire, Northamptonshire, and Nottinghamshire).

Squads

Round-robin

Points table

Source: CricketArchive

Fixtures

Final

Statistics

Most runs
The top five run scorers (total runs) are included in this table.

Source: CricketArchive

Most wickets

The top five wicket takers are listed in this table, listed by wickets taken and then by bowling average.

Source: CricketArchive

References

1990
International women's cricket competitions in England
1990 in women's cricket
International cricket competitions from 1988–89 to 1991
July 1990 sports events in the United Kingdom
1990 in English cricket
cricket
cricket
cricket
cricket